| tries         = {{#expr:
 + 2 + 1 + 2 + 5
 + 2 + 4 + 7 + 2
 + 3 + 2 + 2 + 1
 + 7 + 0 + 1 + 4
 + 4 + 5 + 2 + 5
 + 5 + 2 + 5 + 3
}}
| top scorer    =  Emiliano Boffelli (71) Richie Mo'unga (71)
| most tries    =  Samisoni Taukei'aho (5)
| champion      = New Zealand
| count         = 19
| bledisloe cup = 
| puma trophy   = 
| mandela challenge plate = 
| freedom cup   = 
| preceded by   = 2021
| succeeded by  = 2023
| champdest     = 
}}
The 2022 Rugby Championship was the tenth edition of the annual southern hemisphere competition, involving Argentina, Australia, New Zealand and South Africa. The tournament returned to being staged across all competing nations after the disruption from COVID-19 in 2020 and 2021.

The competition is operated by SANZAAR, a joint venture of the four countries' national unions, and known for sponsorship reasons as The Castle Rugby Championship in South Africa, The Fortinet Rugby Championship in New Zealand, The eToro Rugby Championship in Australia, and The Zurich Rugby Championship in Argentina.

The tournament was restructured for the first time since Argentina joined the competition, with each team playing their games both home and away. Each country hosted three games, but not evenly across the competing nations. Argentina hosted Australia twice and South Africa once; Australia hosted South Africa twice and New Zealand once; New Zealand hosted Argentina twice and Australia once; and South Africa hosted New Zealand twice and Argentina once.

Table

Fixtures

Round 1

Notes:
 Malcolm Marx (South Africa) earned his 50th test cap.
 South Africa win back-to-back matches over New Zealand for the first time since 2009.
 This was South Africa's first home victory over New Zealand since 4 October 2014.
 With this loss, New Zealand lose more than two consecutive games for the first time since 1998.
 As a result of this loss, New Zealand drop to fifth in the World Rugby Rankings, their lowest ranking ever.
 New Zealand lose their opening match of the Rugby Championship/Tri Nations for the first time since 2005.
 It was South Africa's biggest win over New Zealand since 30 June 1928, when South Africa won 17–0 in Kingsmead, Durban.

Notes:
 Michael Hooper (Australia) had been named to start and captain, but withdrew from the team the day before the game and returned to Australia due to personal reasons. Fraser McReight replaced him in the starting XV with James Slipper becoming captain.
 Tomás Albornoz (Argentina) and Matt Gibbon and Jed Holloway (both Australia) made their international debuts.
 Australia retain the Puma Trophy.

Round 2

Notes:
 Bongi Mbonambi (South Africa) had been named to start but withdrew days before the game and was replaced by Joseph Dweba.
 Frans Malherbe (South Africa) earned his 50th test cap.
 Fletcher Newell (New Zealand) made his international debut.
 New Zealand retain the Freedom Cup.

Notes:
 Folau Fainga'a (Australia) had been named to start but withdraw a day before the test due to injury. Lachlan Lonergan replaced him in the starting XV, with Billy Pollard joining on the bench.
 Pone Fa'amausili and Billy Pollard (both Australia) made their international debuts.
 This was Argentina's biggest win over Australia, surpassing their 18–3 win in 1983.

Round 3

Notes:
 This was the first rugby test match hosted at Adelaide Oval since 2004.
 With this win Australia retain the Mandela Challenge Plate

Notes:
 Marcos Kremer (Argentina) earned his 50th cap.
 This was Argentina's first away win against New Zealand, as well as the first time Argentina has won two games in a row in the Rugby Championship.
 Michael Cheika became the second coach to beat New Zealand with two teams (Australia and Argentina). Eddie Jones did so with Australia and England.
 This was the first time that New Zealand lost 3 consecutive home games, and 3 home games in a calendar year.

Round 4

Notes:
 This was New Zealand's biggest win over Argentina since 28 June 1997, also in Hamilton, where they won 62–10.

Notes:
 Taniela Tupou (Australia) was not used as a sub after suffering an injury in a warm-up during the game.
 This was the first test match at the newly opened Sydney Football Stadium.
 This was the first test match that South Africa had won in Australia since 2013.
 Canan Moodie (South Africa) made his international debut and scored a try.

Round 5

Notes:
 Marika Koroibete (Australia) earned his 50th test cap.
 New Zealand retain the Bledisloe Cup.

Notes:
 It was the first international rugby match at the Estadio Libertadores de América. The game was originally scheduled for the Estadio José Amalfitani, Argentina's usual Buenos Aires ground, but a failed pitch inspection forced a move to la Doble Visera, the home of soccer giants Club Atlético Independiente.
 Siya Kolisi (South Africa) earnt his 70th cap.
 Agustín Creevy (Argentina) earnt his 95th cap, becoming the most capped Argentina player.

Round 6

Notes:
 Fletcher Newell (New Zealand) had been named on the bench but withdrew ahead of the game and was replaced by Nepo Laulala.
 With this loss for Australia, the Wallabies drop to 9th in the World Rugby Rankings, their lowest ever ranking.

Statistics

Points scorers

Try scorers

Squads

Summary

Note: Ages, caps and clubs/franchises are of 6 August 2022 – the starting date of the tournament

Argentina
On 21 July, Argentina announced a 34-man squad for the Rugby Championship.

On 14 August, Eduardo Bello, Bautista Delguy, Guido Petti and Santiago Socino joined the squad ahead of their tour to New Zealand in rounds 3 & 4.

On 20 August, Mateo Carreras was a late addition to the travelling squad to New Zealand.

On 7 September, Michael Cheika named a revised squad for the final 2 matches against South Africa.

Australia
On 21 July, Dave Rennie confirmed a 36-player squad for the opening 2 rounds of the Rugby Championship. 

Scott Sio has been ruled out due to a shoulder injury, Tom Robertson was called into the squad as his replacement.

Dave Porecki was ruled out of the Argentine tour due to injury and Billy Pollard was called up to replace him on tour.

On 18 August, Bernard Foley and Langi Gleeson was added to the squad for Australia's round three and four matches against South Africa.

On 8 September, Kurtley Beale and Cadeyrn Neville were called up for the Bledisloe Cup series in rounds five and six.

New Zealand
On 26 July, Fletcher Newell was called into the squad as a replacement for Ofa Tu'ungafasi who suffered a neck injury after the Steinlager Series.

On 5 September, Braydon Ennor and Luke Jacobson were added to the squad for New Zealand's round 5 clash against Australia.

South Africa
On 23 July, head coach Jacques Nienaber named a 41-man squad for the 2022 Rugby Championship.

On 8 August, Canan Moodie was called up to the squad following injury to Kurt-Lee Arendse in the opening round of the Championship.

Head coach:  Jacques Nienaber

Notes

References

2022 in Argentine rugby union
2022 in Australian rugby union
2022 in New Zealand rugby union
2022 in South African rugby union
2022 rugby union tournaments for national teams
August 2022 sports events in Africa
August 2022 sports events in Australia
August 2022 sports events in New Zealand
August 2022 sports events in Argentina
September 2022 sports events in Africa
September 2022 sports events in Australia
September 2022 sports events in New Zealand
September 2022 sports events in Argentina
2022